Livne, also known as Shani is an Israeli settlement. Located in the southern Judaean Mountains, straddling the Green Line and therefore partly in Israel and partly in the West Bank, it is organised as a community settlement and falls under the jurisdiction of Har Hevron Regional Council.

The international community considers Israeli settlements in the West Bank illegal under international law, but the Israeli government disputes this.

Name
Livne is named after biblical Livna (Hebrew לבנה). Livna was a city and periphery mentioned in the Book of Joshua  as being allocated by Joshua and Elazar to the priests (kohanim) who were descendants of biblical Aaron.

History
Modern-day Shani-Livne was established in 1982, It is located on the outskirts of Yatir Forest. with residents moving into permanent housing in 1989. The community was renamed Shani in memory of Shani Shacham, the son of former members killed in the line of duty.

Economy
Residents working in Beer Sheva, Arad, at the Dead Sea Works, communities of the Har Hevron Regional Council, and in the central region. The Yatir region is known among Israelis for its grapes and wine.

References

Israeli settlements in the West Bank
Populated places established in 1982
1982 establishments in Israel
1982 establishments in the Palestinian territories
13 Kohanic cities
Community settlements